S. Rayavaram (Sarvasiddhi Rayavaram) is a village in Anakapalli district in the state of Andhra Pradesh in India. It is the birthplace of Sri Gurajada Apparao, the playwright, poet and social reformer in the Telugu language.

References

Villages in Anakapalli district